Iron Wolf or Ironwolf may refer to:
 Iron Wolf (roller coaster), a former roller coaster at Six Flags Great America
 Ironwolf, an album by George Canyon
 Ironwolf, a DC Comics character
 Iron Wolf (character), a character in the medieval foundation legend of the city of Vilnius
 Motorised Infantry Brigade Iron Wolf, a unit of the Lithuanian Army
 Iron Wolf (organization), a Lithuanian paramilitary movement formed in 1927

See also
Geležinis Vilkas (disambiguation)